Mouss Bangoura (born 27 January 1992) is a Guinean professional footballer who last played as a striker for Albanian club Besëlidhja Lezhë.

References

External links
 

1992 births
Living people
Guinean footballers
Guinean expatriate footballers
Expatriate footballers in Albania
KS Pogradeci players
Besëlidhja Lezhë players
Association football forwards